Pronville-en-Artois (literally "Pronville in Artois"), simply Pronville until 2017, is a commune in the Pas-de-Calais department in the Hauts-de-France region of France.

Geography

Population

Places of interest
 The church of St. Géry, rebuilt, as was much of the village, after the First World War.

See also
Communes of the Pas-de-Calais department

References

Communes of Pas-de-Calais